Indus River System Authority (IRSA) is a water regulator in Pakistan, established in 1992 as an act of Parliament. 

The authority was established for regulating and monitoring the distribution of water resources of the Indus River system among the provinces, in accordance with provisions of the water accord. The Indus River System Authority oversees the allocation of water based on the seasonally available supplies. The Chairman of the authority is Zahid Hussain Junejo.

References

Government agencies of Pakistan
Water in Pakistan
1993 establishments in Pakistan